Justice Dillon may refer to:

Charles Hall Dillon, associate justice of the South Dakota Supreme Court
John Forrest Dillon, associate justice of the Iowa Supreme Court